The 2010 Calgary municipal election was held Monday, October 18, 2010 to elect a mayor and 14 aldermen to the city council, the seven trustees to the Calgary School District (each representing 2 of 14 wards), and four of the seven trustees to the Calgary Catholic School District (each representing 2 of 14 wards). Three incumbent separate school trustees had no challengers. A new mayor was to be elected, as the three term incumbent Dave Bronconnier did not seek re-election. Since 1968, provincial legislation has required every municipality to hold triennial elections.

The voter turnout was 53%, a significant increase from previous elections.

Results
Bold indicates elected, italics indicates incumbent, and asterisk indicates withdrew from race.

Mayor

Aldermen

Public school trustees

Separate school trustees

Candidate summaries

Mayor
Craig Burrows - Former Ward 6 alderman, withdrew from the race on October 14 to back Ric McIver, but still appeared on the ballot.
Joe Connelly - Alderman incumbent to Ward 6.
Bonnie Devine - Previous Communist candidate for Calgary-East MLA.
Barry Erskine - Former alderman, and host of Let's Talk Gardening on AM 770 CHQR.
Oscar Fech - Ran for mayor in 2001 and 2004 elections.
Bob Hawkesworth - Alderman incumbent to Ward 4, withdrew from the race on October 13 to back Barb Higgins, but still appeared on the ballot.
Barb Higgins - Former news anchor at CTV Calgary.
Sandra Hunter -
Gary F. Johnston - Retired rail worker, blind.
Dan Knight -
Amanda Liu -
Jon Lord - Former MLA and alderman.
Ric McIver - Alderman incumbent to Ward 12.
Naheed K. Nenshi - Served on the leadership team of imagineCalgary.
Wayne Stewart - Former president and CEO of the Calgary Homeless Foundation, withdrew from the race on October 14 to back Naheed Nenshi, but still appeared on the ballot.

See also
List of Calgary municipal elections

References

External links
 The City of Calgary: 2010 General Election
 http://election.gov.calgary.ab.ca/#ALDER11
 http://www.calgarycitynews.com/2010/10/official-results-for-2010-calgary.html

2010 Alberta municipal elections
2010
2010s in Calgary